CPJ is used as an abbreviation for:

 Center for Public Justice, an independent organization for policy research and civic education based in Washington, D.C.
 Citizens for Public Justice, a nonprofit organization based in Canada
 The Cleft Palate-Craniofacial Journal, a medical journal and the official publication of the American Cleft Palate-Craniofacial Association
 Canadian Pharmacists Journal, formerly known as Canadian Pharmaceutical Journal, both abbreviated CPJ
 Committee to Protect Journalists, an independent nonprofit organization based in New York City, United States
 Communist Party of Jersey, a political party on the island of Jersey
 CPJ, the ICAO airline designator for Corpjet, United States

ja:CPJ